Rovensko may refer to:

Czech Republic
Rovensko pod Troskami, a town in the Liberec Region
Rovensko (Šumperk District), a municipality and village in the Olomouc Region

Slovakia
Rovensko, Senica District, a municipality and village in the Trnava Region

Romania
Rovensko, the Czech name for Ravensca village in Șopotu Nou commune, Romania